This is a list of protests related to the murder of George Floyd in Montana, United States.

Locations

Billings 
About 50 primarily high school and college-age protesters stood in front of the Billings Police Department's downtown station on May 30. On June 7, over 1,000 protesters gathered outside the Yellowstone County Courthouse chanting "Black Lives Matter" and "I can't breathe".

Bozeman 
Approximately 2,000 protesters marched peacefully from Bogert Park to the Gallatin County Courthouse the afternoon of May 31.

Butte 
On June 5, around 100 protesters gathered outside the Butte-Silver Bow Courthouse to support Black Lives Matter. A moment of silence was held to honor George Floyd and others who died from police violence.

Great Falls 
On May 31, a few hundred people gathered along the Central Avenue West bridge to protest the murder of George Floyd.

Hamilton 
On June 7 around 200 demonstrators protested near Main Street.

Havre 
On May 31, around 75 people peacefully marched through town to protest the murder of George Floyd. They knelt for eight minutes outside the Havre Police Department to honor Floyd, then marched to Town Square.

Helena 
About 150 people in Helena gathered in front of the Montana State Capitol building the afternoon of May 31.

Kalispell 
On June 6, over 1,000 people held a largely peaceful protest in Depot Park to support Black Lives Matter and George Floyd. Many armed counter-protesters attended the event as well in order to keep the peace, namely to protect the nearby Flathead County Veterans Memorial from being vandalized.

Missoula 
Hundreds of people peacefully protested outside the Missoula County Courthouse on May 29.

Whitefish 
Beginning on June 1, crowds of up to 70 protesters have been gathering daily to support the worldwide Black Lives Matter movement. On multiple occasions, the group had been stalked by a 51 year old white man who took his provocations to a "nose-to-nose" level, knocking signs out of hands and yelling expletives in protesters' faces. The man was charged with disorderly conduct on June 4.

References 

Montana
2020 in Montana
Events in Montana
Riots and civil disorder in Montana
May 2020 events in the United States
June 2020 events in the United States